Norvald Tveit (22 December 1927 – 2 May 2022) was a Norwegian writer and playwright, born in Leirvik in the municipality of Hyllestad.

Career
Tveit made his literary debut in 1960 with the biografical story En sjel og en skjorte. His plays include the comedies Splint (1977), Ungkarsfesten (1998) and Uventa lykke for Anders Lone (2001), and I satans vald from 1986. He also wrote four episodes of the TV series Vestavind, and has written books on local history as well as biographies. 

He was awarded the Norwegian Ibsen Award in 1993, and the Cultural prize of Sogn og Fjordane in 2003. In 2007 he received the King's Medal of Merit in gold.

References

1927 births
2022 deaths
People from Hyllestad
Norwegian biographers
Norwegian dramatists and playwrights